Toonatics is a children's television program that was first broadcast on Children's BBC between the summers of 1997 and 1998. The show was created, directed and presented by Paul Burnham (as Thomas 'Tommy' Toon). The show broadcast cartoons, which included Tom and Jerry and Looney Tunes, and played games in between each cartoon.

Plot 
Every day Tommy Toon's mum went out to the shop and told her son "Thomas, Thomas, I'm going to the shop. So you'd better not start watching those crazy cartoons!" But regardless of his Mum's orders, Tommy doesn't care and invites four Toonatics to join him to find the greatest cartoon of all time, plus play a few mini-games in-between, before Tommy's mum comes back from the shop.

Series 2 changes 
From Series 2 onwards Tommy toon is still present but he longer acts like an immature kid.

Episodes 

 Series 1: 29 June – 28 September 1997: 14 episodes 
 Series 2: 1 February – 29 March 1998: 7 episodes 
 Series 3: 24 July – 4 September: 25 episodes 
Last Episode on 2 January 1999

References

External links 
Toonatics on Paul Burnham's website

BBC children's television shows
1990s British children's television series
1997 British television series debuts
1998 British television series endings